Lyman Gillett Hinckley (April 13, 1832 – November 26, 1887) was a lawyer and politician who served as the 30th lieutenant governor of Vermont from 1874 to 1876.

Early life
Lyman Gillett Hinckley was born in the Post Mills area of Thetford, Vermont on April 13, 1832, a son of Lyman Hinckley and Phebe (Gillett) Hinckley. His father was a noted anti-slavery activist and served in local offices including assistant judge of the Orange County court.

Hinckley attended the schools of Thetford and graduated from Thetford Academy in 1851. In 1852, he began attendance at Dartmouth College while teaching school and selling books and newspaper subscriptions door-to-door to pay his tuition. He graduated in 1856, and moved to Chelsea. Hinckley studied law with William Hebard and Burnham Martin and was admitted to the bar in 1860. Hinckley did not actively practice law, preferring instead to concentrate on his duties as county clerk.

Political career
A Republican, from 1856 to 1859 he was Assistant Clerk of the Vermont House of Representatives, and he was Clerk of Orange County, Vermont from 1860 until his death.  Hinckley served as a Town of Chelsea Justice of the Peace and Town Meeting Moderator, also serving in the Vermont House of Representatives from 1862 to 1864 and 1868 to 1870. From 1872 to 1874 he served in the Vermont Senate and was chosen to serve as President pro tem.  He was then elected Lieutenant Governor and served one term, 1874 to 1876. In 1878 and 1880 he returned to the Vermont House of Representatives.

Death and burial
Hinckley died suddenly on November 26, 1887 while in Boston to visit his sisters for Thanksgiving.  He was buried Highland Cemetery in Chelsea.

Family
In 1861, Hinckley married Mary Sybil Henry of Waterbury, Vermont, the sister of William Wirt Henry. They had a daughter, Hattie, who died in 1872 at age eight. Mary Hinckley died in 1874, and Lyman Hinckley never remarried.

Hinckley's sister Amelia was the wife of architect George Albert Clough.

References 

1832 births
1875 deaths
Dartmouth College alumni
Vermont lawyers
Lieutenant Governors of Vermont
Vermont state senators
Presidents pro tempore of the Vermont Senate
Members of the Vermont House of Representatives
People from Thetford, Vermont
Burials in Vermont
19th-century American politicians
19th-century American lawyers